Bobby Ray Barbosa Parks Jr. (born February 19, 1993) is a Filipino-American professional basketball player for Nagoya Diamond Dolphins of the Japanese B.League. A 6'4" guard, he played college basketball for the NU Bulldogs for three years before declaring for the NBA draft in 2015 where he went undrafted.

Early life and high school career
Parks was born in Parañaque, Metro Manila to Bobby Parks Sr. and Marifer Celine Barbosa. His father was playing basketball in the Philippines. Parks Sr. had been drafted 58th overall in the third round of the 1984 NBA draft and went on to become a seven-time Philippine Basketball Association (PBA) Best Import awardee and Hall of Famer. Parks Sr. and Barbosa separated. Barbosa moved to Los Angeles in 2003, while Parks Sr. left for Memphis, Tennessee, in 2005.  Parks and his younger sister, Celine, remained in the Philippines until 2006, when his sister went to live with their mother, while he went to live with his father and his stepfamily, who were also Filipino.

After moving to Memphis, Parks started playing organized basketball at the age of 13. As a freshman and sophomore, he attended St. George's Independent School in Collierville, Tennessee, where he was named Tennessee's Division II-A Mr. Basketball as the state's private school player of the year in 2009.

Parks transferred to Melrose High School for the 2009–10 season and helped his team win a class AAA state championship. In November 2010, he committed to Georgia Tech as the No. 31-ranked shooting guard in the class of 2011, but later decommitted and followed his father back to the Philippines.

College career
In September 2010, Parks enrolled in a computer course at National University in Manila with the hopes of playing for the NU Bulldogs in 2011. Since Parks came from a foreign high school, he had to sit out one year before the 2011 season, which prevented him from winning Rookie of the Year as he would no longer be considered a fresh graduate. Needless to say, he  still qualified for the MVP award, which he eventually won during his first University Athletic Association of the Philippines (UAAP) season with the Bulldogs, as Parks averaged 20.0 points, 6.5 rebounds, 2.9 assists, 1.1 blocks and 1.1 steals per game and was named the Most Valuable Player of seasons 74 and 75.

Professional career

In 2015, Parks was in pursuit of being the first Filipino-born player to play in the NBA. He became automatically eligible for the 2015 NBA draft as an international player who turned 22 during the calendar year of the draft. In June 2015, prior to the 2015 NBA draft, Parks was invited to work out for the Utah Jazz, Brooklyn Nets, Dallas Mavericks, Atlanta Hawks and Boston Celtics.

Parks went undrafted, but received an invitation from the Dallas Mavericks to play for their Summer League team. In six games for Dallas, he averaged 3.0 points and 1.7 rebounds per game, becoming the first Filipino-born player to play in the Summer League.

NBA D-League
On October 31, 2015, Parks was selected by the Texas Legends in the second round of the 2015 NBA Development League Draft. He became the second Filipino to be drafted in the NBA D-League after Japeth Aguilar in 2012.

Parks made his debut with the Legends on November 23, 2015, against the Austin Spurs. He went scoreless in 10 minutes of play and went 0-of-2 from the field. On December 13, 2015, he scored his first basket for the Legends. Parks' putback layup with 14.5 seconds remaining gave him his first-ever basket in the D-League. He also finished with one assist and three rebounds in six minutes of action against the Sioux Falls Skyforce. On April 1, 2016, he scored a career-high 16 points against the Oklahoma City Blue. In 2015–16, Parks averaged 4.6 points and 1.9 rebounds in 32 games.

After the Legends did not retain Parks for the 2016–17 season, he entered the 2016 NBA Development League Draft, where he was selected in the sixth round by the Westchester Knicks. He was unsuccessful in gaining an opening-night roster spot with Westchester, as the team waived him on November 9, 2016.

ASEAN Basketball League
On November 18, 2016, Parks officially joined Alab Pilipinas of the ASEAN Basketball League (ABL). On December 11, 2016, he scored a career-high 41 points and 14 rebounds against the Kaohsiung Truth. After his first season with Alab Pilipinas, he was named the local MVP of the season.

MPBL
After his stint the ABL, Parks joined the Maharlika Pilipinas Basketball League (MPBL), an amateur regional league in the Philippines which imposes a cap on imports, including Filipinos with foreign heritage like himself. He was signed in by Mandaluyong El Tigre in May 2018.

PBA

Blackwater Elite
Parks entered the 2018 PBA draft where he was selected by Blackwater Elite. He was the second overall pick for that draft.

TNT Tropang Giga
Parks was traded to the TNT Tropang Giga from Blackwater Elite in November 2019 in the middle of the 2019 PBA Governors' Cup. With TNT, Parks had his first semifinal run only for his team to lose to eventual finalist Meralco Bolts. After the conclusion of the 2019 season, he signed a new one-year deal with TNT in February 2020. In the Philippine Cup, which was the lone conference for the 2020 season, Parks helped TNT to its first "All-Filipino" finals in seven years only losing to eventual champions Barangay Ginebra San Miguel.

Parks contract with TNT expired after the 2020 season. In March 2021, Parks announced that he would not feature in the PBA for the 2021 season citing personal reasons to tend to his family. However the move risked a fallout between Parks and TNT with team owner and PLDT chairman Manny V. Pangilinan to express his doubts on Parks reason for sitting out the 2021 season through social media posting a photo of him having a vacation in La Union. While Parks is a free agent, TNT still hold the signing rights to him; he would only be able to play for another PBA team if TNT release him without pre-conditions or trade him. 

TNT and the PBA allowed Parks to play in Japan in July 2021 but TNT would have exclusive rights to re-sign him if he decides to return to the PBA within five years.

B. League

Nagoya Diamond Dolphins
On August 24, 2021, Parks signed with the Nagoya Diamond Dolphins of Japan's B. League as the team's Asian import. On May 28, 2022, it was announced that Parks signed a one-year contract extension with the team.

National team career
In 2015, Parks played for Gilas Cadets at the SEABA championships and the Southeast Asian Games.

In July 2016, Parks played for Gilas Pilipinas at the FIBA Olympic Qualifying Tournament in Manila.

Parks was part of the team that represented the Philippines in the 2017 Southeast Asian Games. They won the gold medal after beating Indonesia 94–55, winning his 3rd SEA Games Gold medal in the process.

Five years later, Parks returned to the national team for the 2022 FIBA Asia Cup. The team failed to make the quarterfinals of that tournament.

Career statistics

UAAP 

|-
| align="left" | 2011-12
| align="left";  rowspan=3| NU
| 13 || 33.4 || .433 || .306 || .783 || 6.5 || 2.9 || 1.2 || 1.1 || 20.8
|-
| align="left" | 2012-13
| 15 || 34.0 || .391 || .267 || .773 || 7.4 || 4.4 || 1.5 || 1.2 || 20.7
|-
| align="left" | 2013-14
| 16 || 31.8 || .364 || .257 || .732 || 8.1 || 3.7 || 1.3 || 1.1 || 17.8
|-class=sortbottom
| align="center" colspan=2 | Career
| 44 || 33.0 || .392 || .275 || .763 || 7.4 || 3.7 || 1.3 || 1.1 || 19.7

NBA G League

|-
| align="left"| 2015–16
| align="left"| Texas Legends
| 32 || 13.3 || .426 || .194 || .660 || 1.9 || .8 || .6 || .1 || 4.6
|-class=sortbottom
| align="center" colspan=2 | Career
| 32 || 13.3 || .426 || .194 || .660 || 1.9 || .8 || .6 || .1 || 4.6

ASEAN Basketball League

|-
| align=left | 2016–17
| align=left | Alab
| 21 || 30.2 || .456 || .419 || .808 || 7.2 || 4.1 || .9 || .7 || 18.3
|-
| align=left | 2017–18
| align=left | Alab
| 29 || 31.8 || .462 || .356 || .733 || 5.2 || 3.5 || 1.3 || .7 || 16.7
|-
| align=left | 2018–19
| align=left | Alab
| 25 || 29.8 || .513 || .407 || .771 || 4.2 || 3.3 || .8 || .4 || 15.8
|-class=sortbottom
| align="center" colspan=2 | Career
| 75 || 30.7 || .475 || .388 || .771 || 5.4 || 3.6 || 1.0 || .6 || 16.9

Philippine Basketball Association
As of the end of 2020 season

|-
| align=left | 
| align=left | Blackwater / TNT
| 32 || 37.3 || .398 || .332 || .761 || 6.3 || 3.5 || 1.4 || .3 || 18.8
|-
| align=left | 
| align=left | TNT
| 17 || 39.7 || .492 || .458 || .845 || 7.8 || 3.1 || 1.5 || .4 || 22.4
|- class="sortbottom"
| style="text-align:center;" colspan="2"|Career
| 49 || 38.1 || .429 || .378 || .790 || 6.9 || 3.4 || 1.4 || .3 || 20.0

References

External links
 NBA D-League profile
 PBA-Online.net profile
 Spin.ph profile
 The lost boy of the Class of 2011
 

1993 births
Living people
American men's basketball players
Basketball players at the 2010 Summer Youth Olympics
Basketball players from Metro Manila
Blackwater Bossing draft picks
Blackwater Bossing players
Competitors at the 2011 Southeast Asian Games
Filipino expatriate basketball people in Japan
Filipino expatriate basketball people in the United States
Filipino men's 3x3 basketball players
Filipino men's basketball players
Filipino people of African-American descent
Maharlika Pilipinas Basketball League players
Nagoya Diamond Dolphins players
NU Bulldogs basketball players
People from Parañaque
Philippines men's national basketball team players
Philippines national 3x3 basketball team players
Point guards
San Miguel Alab Pilipinas players
Shooting guards
Southeast Asian Games gold medalists for the Philippines
Southeast Asian Games medalists in basketball
Texas Legends players
TNT Tropang Giga players